Right Now may refer to:

Present, the time associated with events perceived directly

Music

Albums 
 Right Now (Atomic Kitten album) or the title song (see below), 2000
 Right Now (Fabrizio Sotti Album) or the title song, 2013
 Right Now (Grandmaster Mele-Mel & Scorpio album) or the title song, 1997
 Right Now (Herbie Mann album) or the title song (see below), 1962
 Right Now! (Jackie McLean album) or the title song, 1966
 Right Now (Leon Jackson album) or the title song, a cover of the Herbie Mann song (see below), 2008
 Right Now! (Little Richard album), 1974
 Right Now! (Mel Tormé album) or the title song, a cover of the Herbie Mann song (see below), 1966
 Right Now! (Pussy Galore album), 1987
 Right Now (Rushlow album) or the title song, 2003
 Right Now (Wizz Jones album) or the title song, 1972
 Right Now: Live at the Jazz Workshop, by Charles Mingus, 1966

Songs 
 "Right Now" (Al B. Sure! song), 1992
 "Right Now" (Allday song), 2014
 "Right Now" (Asian Kung-Fu Generation song), 2016
 "Right Now" (Atomic Kitten song), 1999
 "Right Now" (Futurasound song), 2003
 "Right Now" (Gene Vincent song), 1959; covered by Mary Chapin Carpenter, 1991
 "Right Now" (Herbie Mann song), 1962; covered by Mel Tormé, Siouxsie/The Creatures, The Pussycat Dolls, and others
 "Right Now" (Korn song), 2003
 "Right Now" (Mary J. Blige song), 2014
 "Right Now" (Nick Jonas and Robin Schulz song), 2018
 "Right Now" (Psy song), 2010
 "Right Now" (Rihanna song), 2013
 "Right Now" (SR-71 song), 2000
 "Right Now" (Van Halen song), 1992
 "Right Now (Na Na Na)", by Akon, 2008
 "Right Now", by Billy Preston from Encouraging Words, 1970
 "Right Now", by Chris Gaines, a reworking of the 1970 Youngbloods song "Get Together", 1999
 "Right Now", by Danity Kane from Danity Kane, 2006
 "Right Now", by Emeli Sandé from Long Live the Angels, 2016
 "Right Now", by the Flaming Lips from Telepathic Surgery, 1989
 "Right Now", by Fort Minor from The Rising Tied, 2005
 "Right Now", by Haim from Something to Tell You, 2017
 "Right Now", by Jeanette from Rock My Life, 2002
 "Right Now", by John Cena from You Can't See Me, 2005
 "Right Now", by Lil Baby from Harder Than Ever, 2018
 "Right Now", by Lil' Kim from The Notorious K.I.M., 2000
 "Right Now", by Lil Uzi Vert from Luv Is Rage, 2015
 "Right Now", by One Direction from Midnight Memories, 2013
 "Right Now", by Sabrina Carpenter from Eyes Wide Open, 2015
 "Right Now", by Sara Groves from Invisible Empires, 2011
 "Right Now", by Snakehips, 2017
 "Right Now", by Sophie and the Giants, 2021
 "Right Now", by the Vamps, 2019

Other media 
 Aziz Ansari: Right Now, a 2019 stand-up comedy special by Aziz Ansari
 Right Now (book), a 2010 book by Michael Steele
 Right Now (film), a 2004 French film
 Right Now! (magazine), a British political magazine 1993–2006
 RightNow Technologies, a defunct software company acquired by Oracle

See also
 Right Here, Right Now (disambiguation)